Mount Steep is a mountain rising to 978 m at the east side of Lake Buddha in the Denton Hills on the Scott Coast of Antarctica It was named by New Zealand Geographic Board (NZGB) in 1994; the name is suggested by the steep climb of the west side of the mountain.

Mountains of Victoria Land
Scott Coast